Ali Al-Abdali (born 5 February 1979) is a former Saudi Arabian footballer who played as a defender. He spent the majority of his career at Al-Ahli and he also played for Al-Raed, Al-Qadsiah, Al-Ansar, and Al-Rabe'e. He played for the Saudi Arabia national team in the 2004 AFC Asian Cup.

Honours
Al-Ahli
Crown Prince Cup: 2001–02, 2006–07
Federation Cup: 2000–01, 2001–02, 2006–07
Arab Unified Club Championship: 2002–03
Gulf Club Champions Cup: 2002, 2008

References 

1979 births
Living people
Saudi Arabian footballers
Saudi Arabia international footballers
Association football defenders
2004 AFC Asian Cup players
Saudi Professional League players
Saudi First Division League players
Saudi Second Division players
Al-Ahli Saudi FC players
Al-Raed FC players
Al-Qadsiah FC players
Al-Ansar FC (Medina) players
Jeddah Club players